Podbara is an urban neighborhood of the city of Novi Sad, Serbia.

Borders

The southern borders of Podbara are Ulica Miloša Bajića (Miloš Bajić Street), Trg Republike (Square of the Republic), Daničićeva ulica (Daničić Street), Ulica Zlatne grede (Zlatna Greda Street), Pašićeva ulica (Pašić Street), Ulica Matice srpske (Matica Srpska Street), Sterijina ulica (Sterija Street), and Ulica Hadžić Svetića (Hadžić Svetić Street), the western border is Temerinska ulica (Temerin Street), the northern border is Danube-Tisa-Danube channel, and the eastern border is Danube river.

Neighbouring city quarters
The neighbouring city quarters are: Stari Grad in the south, and Salajka in the west.

Features
The industrial zone known as the Radna Zona Sever 3 is located in the north of Podbara. Almaška Church, an Orthodox church built in 1797 is situated in Podbara.

Gallery

See also
 Neighborhoods of Novi Sad

References

Jovan Mirosavljević, Brevijar ulica Novog Sada 1745-2001, Novi Sad, 2002.
Zoran Rapajić, Novi Sad bez tajni, Beograd, 2002.
Milorad Grujić, Vodič kroz Novi Sad i okolinu, Novi Sad, 2004.

External links
Detailed map of Novi Sad and Podbara
Map of Novi Sad

Novi Sad neighborhoods